Mee kolo or kolo mee (Malay: Mi Kolok; Iban: Mi Kering or Mi Rangkai) is Malaysian dish of dry noodles tossed in a savoury pork and shallot mixture, topped off with fragrant fried onions originated from the state of Sarawak, characteristically light and tossed in a transparent sauce. Mee kolo is a Sarawakian Chinese favourite, and is served any time of the day for breakfast, lunch, and supper.

Ingredients 
Mee kolo is distinguished from other Asian noodle dish recipes. The difference between kolo mee and wonton mee, the latter being  popular in Peninsular Malaysia, is that  kolo mee is not drenched in dark soy sauce and water is not added to the noodles when served. Mee kolo comes in two common flavours: plain or seasoned with red sauce (sauce from char siu marination). Mee kolo usually served with soup and soy sauce, to give the dish a darker appearance and enhance its saltiness. Mee kolo noodles are springier than wonton noodles and they come with a generous filling of minced meat. The mee kolo is topped with spring onion and fried onion, giving the dish a sweet crunchiness. This dish is often also served with slices of char siu, which are placed on top of the noodles.

References 

Malaysian cuisine